Zsolt Bor (born 1949) is a Hungarian physicist, currently working at the University of Szeged. He has a BSc in Electrical Engineering from the Technical University in Kiev (1973), an MSc in physics (1974), and PhD in Physics  from JATE University (1975). He is a member of the Academia Europaea, the Hungarian Academy of Sciences, the Quantum Electronics and Optics Division of the European Physical Society, the Commission on Quantum Electronics, and Hungarian Physical Society Department of Optics and Quantum Electronics. He is one of the inventors of the Rhinolight phototherapeutical apparatus for hay fever therapy.

References

1949 births
Living people
Members of the Hungarian Academy of Sciences
Academic staff of the University of Szeged
20th-century Hungarian physicists
21st-century Hungarian  physicists